Igbinoghene is a surname from Nigeria. Notable people with the surname include:

 Festus Igbinoghene (born 1969), Nigerian Olympic athlete
 Noah Igbinoghene (born 1999), American football player, son of Festus

Surnames of Nigerian origin